Jason Deneen Beghe (born March 12, 1960) is an American actor. Since 2014, he has starred in the NBC TV series Chicago P.D. as sergeant Hank Voight. He is also known for starring in the 1988 George A. Romero film Monkey Shines, playing Demi Moore's love interest in G.I. Jane, appearing as a police officer in the film Thelma & Louise, starring opposite Moira Kelly in the television series To Have & to Hold, and having recurring roles on Picket Fences, Melrose Place, Chicago Hope, American Dreams,  Cane, and Californication.

Beghe is a former Scientologist. He began taking Scientology courses in 1994 and later appeared in a Church of Scientology advertising campaign and in promotional videos. Beghe left the church in 2007 and has publicly criticized Scientology since then.

Early life
Beghe, who is of Italian, German, English, and French Canadian heritage, was born March 12, 1960, in New York City, the son of tax court judge Renato Beghe, and has three siblings. He attended the Collegiate School, a private preparatory school for boys located in New York City. While there, he became best friends with John F. Kennedy Jr. and actor David Duchovny; another classmate was dancer Christopher d'Amboise. Kennedy and Beghe often spent time together outside the Metropolitan Museum of Art and in Central Park, while being monitored by Kennedy's Secret Service detail. Beghe later persuaded Duchovny to pursue work in acting.

He went to college at Pomona College, graduating in 1982.

Acting career
Prior to his acting career, Beghe worked as a model in Europe. He had his feature film debut in the 1985 film Compromising Positions, starring Susan Sarandon, and in 1986 had his first recurring role on television on the HBO situation comedy series 1st & Ten. He starred alongside O. J. Simpson and Sam J. Jones in HBO's sequel to 1st & Ten titled Training Camp: The Bulls Are Back, and John Voorhees of The Seattle Times wrote: "The cast, which includes O.J. Simpson, Sam Jones and newcomer Jason Beghe, is first-rate."

In 1988, he starred in the film Monkey Shines: An Experiment In Fear, directed by George A. Romero. He portrayed Allan Mann, a law student made quadriplegic when hit by a truck in the opening credits of the film. The Philadelphia Inquirer gave a positive review of Beghe's performance in Monkey Shines: "Acting only with his face and voice, Jason Beghe is terrific at conveying the mounting anger and rage of an active man made passive". David Foil of The Advocate described Beghe's performance as "remarkable simply for meeting the demands of the character".

Beghe played an ice hockey star in the Perry Mason TV film The Case of the All-Star Assassin, an NBC-TV telefeature broadcast November 19, 1989. In 1991, he played a State Trooper in the film Thelma & Louise (reuniting him with Sarandon, with whom he'd appeared in Compromising Positions), and was Demi Moore's love interest in the 1997 film G.I. Jane. He had recurring roles on Picket Fences and Melrose Place, and became a cast member of Chicago Hope in 1997, portraying electrician Danny Blaines opposite romantic interest Dr. Austin played by Christine Lahti. In a 1997 interview in The Boston Herald, Beghe spoke about his respect for his fellow cast members in Chicago Hope: "I think it's the best cast assembled that I've ever seen. One for one, they're incredible. And to work with Christine Lahti? I'd drop a lot of things for that. She's so good and smart and dedicated. I've become a better actor just for working with her." He commented on his character on Melrose Place, a closeted military officer who had feelings for Matt, played by Doug Savant: "I thought we should kiss, but it was too much. TV is a very specific medium, and you're naive if you think that everything is just based on artistic decisions. If it prevents them from selling some products, that's a major consideration. But I'm an actor. I'll do whatever it takes." In 1993, Beghe played Lt. Pat Rudledge in the television drama series Matlock.

Beghe co-starred with Moira Kelly in the 1998 CBS television drama series To Have & to Hold, where he played police officer Sean McGrail. Mike Duffy of the Detroit Free Press wrote: "There is an affectionate romantic sizzle between the ruggedly handsome Beghe ("G.I. Jane") and the dark-haired, unconventionally attractive Kelly ("Little Odessa")." Kinney Littlefield of the Orange County Register said that "Beghe and Kelly have charm."

Beghe appeared in acting roles on Numb3rs, CSI: NY, Everwood, Criminal Minds, Veronica Mars, "Jag" and Cane. Beghe portrayed exorcist Ray Purvis in the 2008 horror film One Missed Call. In 2009, Beghe had a guest-starring role on the television show Californication. He played the character novelist Richard Bates, a friend of character Hank Moody (played by David Duchovny). "Bates, played by Jason Beghe, made for an interesting character and the fact that he didn't get as much screen time as some of the other characters is a shame," wrote Danny Gallagher of TV Squad. In October 2009, Beghe was in Pittsburgh, Pennsylvania for the filming of the movie The Next Three Days, directed by Paul Haggis. The film was released in 2010 and starred Elizabeth Banks, Russell Crowe, Brian Dennehy, and Olivia Wilde.

Since 2014, Beghe has starred on Chicago P.D.; the show is a spin-off of Chicago Fire, on which Beghe played a recurring role. Chicago P.D. follows the detectives of the Chicago Police Department's Intelligence Unit that combats the city's major offenses, including organized crime, drug trafficking, and high-profile murders. Beghe plays the role of Sgt. Hank Voight, a "tough cop" who heads the Intelligence Unit. On November 21, 2017, Deadline Hollywood reported that Beghe was investigated for behavior that was considered overly aggressive and possibly sexual harassment while filming Chicago P.D. in 2016. Claims of inappropriate behavior were reportedly made by his former co-star, Sophia Bush. Beghe released a statement in which he acknowledged having anger problems, stated that he was working on them, admitted to engaging in aggressive behavior on set, and apologized.

Scientology

Involvement in Scientology
In 1994, while taking an acting class taught by Scientologist Milton Katselas, Beghe decided to take some Scientology courses. Fellow acting student Bodhi Elfman gave him a book about Scientology. In 1999, Beghe helped promote a "What is Scientology?" exhibition as part of a Church of Scientology television advertising campaign in the United Kingdom. He appeared in Scientology promotional videos in 2005. Beghe estimated that he gave the Church of Scientology US$1 million over a 12-year period.

In 2007, Beghe decided to leave Scientology. One of the first people he went to see after his departure was his friend David Duchovny. During the years of his involvement in Scientology, his relationship with Duchovny had suffered; Duchovny was referred to as a "Suppressive Person", a term used by Scientologists for those believed to be working against the Church of Scientology.

Criticism of Scientology

Beghe began to publicly criticize the Church of Scientology in April 2008. He participated in an interview about his experiences as a Scientologist; a clip of that interview was published online by Scientology critic Mark Bunker in mid-April 2008. In the video, Beghe asserted that Scientology was "very dangerous for your spiritual, psychological, mental, emotional health and evolution". The clip ended with Beghe stating, "I don't have an agenda. I'm just trying to help. [...] I have the luxury of having gotten into Scientology and after having been in it, been out. And that's a perspective that people who are still in and not out do not have." Marina Hyde of The Guardian has called Beghe a Scientology celebrity whistleblower.

On April 28, 2008, Beghe posted online a letter to Church leader David Miscavige. In the letter, he requested the confidential confessional files that Scientology compiles during Auditing sessions. Beghe told The Village Voice that these confidential files are kept on actor Tom Cruise and other celebrity Scientologists.

Beghe has asserted that Scientology's practice of disconnection was still in place as of 2008. In an interview with Tony Ortega of The Village Voice, Beghe stated that the expulsion of his four-year-old son from a Scientology school was an example of disconnection. Beghe has turned down opportunities to speak about his experiences with Scientology on television; he says, "I just wanted to make sure that the story isn't about me. It's not about me. It's about helping others who are still lost in the cult, or toying with the idea of getting involved."

On May 29, 2008, Beghe attended a protest against the Church of Scientology held outside the Scientology building on East 46th Street in New York City. In September 2008, Beghe traveled to Europe where he spoke with government officials in Hamburg, Germany, about his experiences as a Scientologist. Beghe suggested that governments put up warning signs about Scientology that are similar to warnings placed on packs of cigarettes; the next day, a member of Germany's Interior Department told him such a sign was placed outside a Church of Scientology building in Berlin.

Beghe was a guest in May 2009 on the BBC World Service radio program World: Have Your Say, where he discussed his views on what he thought of Scientology when he first joined: "I thought that it was something that was going to deliver miracles, and that it was the most selfless group of people that were totally dedicated to helping mankind, and I wanted to be part of it." He was also critical of Scientology leadership: "I think that there are probably things of Scientology that are valuable and that can help people – my main issue is not with Scientology per se, it is with Scientology the organization – it is a corrupt I believe and probably a criminal endeavor, and that has to do with people who are in charge of Scientology mainly David Miscavige..."

In September 2010, Beghe took part in a BBC News Panorama documentary, The Secrets of Scientology, in which he spoke about his decision to leave the organization. Beghe also appeared in the 2015 HBO documentary Going Clear, based upon the book of the same name by Lawrence Wright.

Personal life
Beghe's sister, Francesca Beghe, is a singer-songwriter who released a self-titled album in 1991 with SBK Records. His great-grandfather was Charles S. Deneen, a two-term governor of Illinois and one-term U.S. Senator in the late 1920s.

Beghe and David Duchovny are close friends; he was best man at Duchovny's wedding to actress Téa Leoni in 1997.

Beghe is known for his signature "gravelly" voice owing to a car accident in 1999. He said, "I was intubated, and I kept pulling this tube out of my throat."

Beghe married Angie Janu in 2000. The couple have two children. He lives in Nichols Canyon, Los Angeles, California. In December 2017, Beghe filed for divorce, which was granted in September 2020.

Filmography

Film

Television

References

External links

1960 births
Living people
20th-century American male actors
21st-century American male actors
American former Scientologists
American male film actors
American male television actors
American male voice actors
Collegiate School (New York) alumni
Critics of Scientology
Male actors from New York City
Pomona College alumni
Articles containing video clips
American people of Italian descent